is a noted Japanese author. He was born in Osaka Prefecture and graduated from Waseda University. He won the 42nd Yomiuri Prize (1990) for Hyōga ga kuru made ni.

References

Japanese writers
Living people
1936 births
Writers from Osaka Prefecture
Yomiuri Prize winners